Wingle may refer to:

 Blake Wingle (born 1960), a former Guard in the National Football League
 Mikayla Wingle, former contestant on American reality television show Survivor
 Great Wall Wingle, a pickup truck manufactured by the Chinese company Great Wall Motors since 2006

See also
 Wingles, a commune of the Pas-de-Calais department of France